Suzhi is an impact crater on Mars, located in the Iapygia quadrangle at 27.7°S and 274.0°W. It measures  in diameter and was named by the International Astronomical Union (IAU) Working Group for Planetary System Nomenclature in 1991 after a place in China. There may have been a lake in the crater in the past because layers are visible in a depression on the floor.

See also 
 Climate of Mars
 Geology of Mars
 Groundwater on Mars
 HiRISE
 HiWish program
 Impact event
 Lakes on Mars
 List of craters on Mars
 Ore resources on Mars
 Planetary nomenclature

References 

Impact craters on Mars
Iapygia quadrangle